Curt Young (born 18 January 1974) is a former Panamanian hurdler who competed in the 1996 Summer Olympics and the 2000 Summer Olympics. In 1996, he failed to advance from the first round with a score of 55.20. In 2000, he bettered his first round time to 52.46, but still it wasn't enough to advance.

References

1974 births
Living people
Panamanian male hurdlers
Athletes (track and field) at the 1996 Summer Olympics
Athletes (track and field) at the 2000 Summer Olympics
Olympic athletes of Panama